Robat-e Sofla or Robat Sofla may refer to:
 Robat-e Sofla, Khuzestan
 Robat-e Sofla, Markazi

See also
 Robat (disambiguation)
 Robat-e Olya (disambiguation)